Enispodes is a monotypic moth genus of the family Erebidae described by Warren in 1913. Its only species, Enispodes purpurea, was first described by George Hampson in 1910. It is found in Peninsular Malaysia, Singapore and Borneo.

Taxonomy
The genus has previously been classified in the subfamily Acontiinae of the family Noctuidae.

References

Boletobiinae
Noctuoidea genera